Peltigera membranacea is a species of lichenized fungus in the family Peltigeraceae. It has a foliose growth pattern, with what appear to be veins in the leaf-like parts, but these do not have a vascular function. The apothecia are erect, numerous, and often a bright brown-orange in colour. Some simple sequence repeat markers have been  developed for both the fungal partner (mycobiont) of Peltigera membranacea and its Nostoc photobiont partner; these allow for both population genetic studies and an alternative means of identifying between P. membranacea and its lookalikes.

References

membranacea
Lichen species
Lichens described in 1810
Lichens of North America
Lichens of Canada
Taxa named by Erik Acharius
Fungi without expected TNC conservation status